Michael Spence is an American-born economist and winner of the 2001 Nobel Memorial Prize in Economic Sciences

Michael Spence may also refer to:

 Michael Spence (legal scholar) (born 1962), Australian-born academic and current president and provost of University College London
 Michael Spence (Holby City), a character in the BBC medical drama Holby City
 Michael Spence, American steeplechase runner, participated in Athletics at the 2007 Pan American Games
 Michael Spence (rugby league) (born 1988), rugby league player for the Brisbane Broncos
 Mike Spence (1936–1968), British racing driver